Banksia porrecta is a species of prostrate shrub that is endemic to the south-west of Western Australia. It has hairy, underground stems, pinnatipartite leaves with up to forty narrow triangular lobes on each side, yellow flowers in heads of between twenty and thirty, and one or two egg-shaped follicles in each head.

Description
Banksia porrecta is a prostrate shrub with hairy underground stems.

Taxonomy and naming
This species was first formally described in 1996 by Alex George who gave it the name Dryandra porrecta and published the description in the journal Nuytsia from specimens he collected near Woodanilling in 1986. The specific epithet (porrecta) is from the Latin porrectus, in turn from porrigo meaning "to spread out" or "to extend", referring to the prostrate habit.

In 2007, Austin Mast and Kevin Thiele transferred all the dryandras to the genus Banksia and this species became Banksia porrecta.

Distribution and habitat
Banksia porrecta grows in low kwongan, often with sedges and mallee eucalypts, in scattered locations between Woodanilling and Tenterden.

Ecology
An assessment of the potential impact of climate change on this species found that its range is likely to contract by between 50% and 80% by 2080, depending on the severity of the change.

Conservation status
Banksia porrecta is classified as "Priority Four" by the Government of Western Australia Department of Parks and Wildlife, meaning that is rare or near threatened.

References

porrecta
Plants described in 1996
Taxa named by Alex George